An Nasiriyah Stadium, is a multi-use stadium in An Nasiriyah, Iraq.  It is currently used mostly for football matches and serves as the home stadium of An Nasiriyah FC. The stadium holds 10,000 people.

See also
 An Nasiriyah FC

References

Football venues in Iraq